Hamam (or Hamamköy) is a village in Mut district of Mersin Province, Turkey. The name of the village hamam means bath in Turkish and it may refer to Göksu River running at the east of the village. The population of the village was 1387 as of 2012.

References

Villages in Mut District